Chafed Elbows is a 1966 still image film directed by Robert Downey Sr.

A manic comic parody underground film made for $12,000, Chafed Elbows was a commercial success. The film was premiered at The Gate Theater in New York City and ran for over one month alongside Scorpio Rising.

Downey photographed most of the movie with a still 35mm camera and had the film processed at Walgreens drugstore. These pictures were animated alongside a few live-action scenes and almost all the dialogue was dubbed to rather hilarious effect. One scene was shot in Anthology Film Archives’s upstairs theater back in the days when the building was still a defunct downtown courthouse.

All 13 of the female roles were played by Elsie Downey, Robert Downey's wife, and the lead male role by George Morgan.

Plot
Hapless Walter Dinsmore undergoes his annual November breakdown at the 1964 New York World's Fair, has a love affair with his mother, recollects his hysterectomy operation, impersonates a cop, is sold as a piece of living art, goes to heaven, and becomes the singer in a rock band, but not necessarily in that order.

Home media
It was released on DVD as part of The Criterion Collection.

See also
List of American films of 1966
Still image film

References

External links

 The Gate Theater by Aldo Tambellini

1966 films
1966 comedy films
Films directed by Robert Downey Sr.
American comedy films
1960s English-language films
1960s American films